Drassinella is a genus of North American araneomorph spiders in the family Phrurolithidae, first described by Nathan Banks in 1904.

Species
 it contains six species:
Drassinella gertschi Platnick & Ubick, 1989 – USA, Mexico
Drassinella modesta Banks, 1904 (type) – USA
Drassinella sclerata (Chamberlin & Ivie, 1935) – USA
Drassinella siskiyou Platnick & Ubick, 1989 – USA
Drassinella sonoma Platnick & Ubick, 1989 – USA
Drassinella unicolor (Chamberlin & Ivie, 1935) – USA

References

Araneomorphae genera
Phrurolithidae
Taxa named by Nathan Banks